Peschanitsa is a rural locality (a village) in Cheryomushskoye Rural Settlement of Kotlassky District, Arkhangelsk Oblast, Russia. The population was 12 as of 2010.

Geography 
Peschanitsa is located 18 km south of Kotlas (the district's administrative centre) by road. Kotelnikovo is the nearest rural locality.

References 

Rural localities in Kotlassky District